Alejandro Reyna, also known as "El Tío Plácido", was a Mexican comic character actor and singer. Reyna usually appeared in films starring Antonio Aguilar. Reyna received a starring role as "Plácido Buenavista" in El ojo de vidrio.

Born in Torreón, Coahuila, Reyna sang norteña music in the group "El Tío Plácido con sus Sobrinos". He appeared in films for the first time in 1958 and left cinema in 1982. After many minor roles, Reyna was given a special billing in Caballo prieto azabache. He was mostly cast as one of Aguilar's sidekicks along with Eleazar García "Chelelo". Such is the case in Lucio Vázquez and Lauro Puñales.

Filmography

External links

20th-century Mexican male actors
Mexican male singers
Male actors from Coahuila
Singers from Coahuila
People from Torreón
Year of birth missing (living people)
Living people